The Leinster Minor Football Championship is the premier under-17 "knockout" competition in gaelic football played in the province of Leinster. 2017 was the final year of the minor under 18 football championship as it were replaced by an under 17 championship following a vote at the GAA congress on 26 February 2016.

The current Leinster champions are Meath. The Leinster minor football championship is known as Fr. Larry Murray Trophy. The Cup is named after Fr. Larry Murray who was an underage GAA mentor in both Louth and Armagh, hence the Ulster Minor Football Championship is also named after Fr. Larry Murray.

History
Longford won in the first year of the Leinster Minor Championship in 1929 in Navan, Co. Meath. They beat Dublin in the final by a scoreline of 3–04 to 1–04 in the final. Longford went on to reach the All-Ireland final that year but failed to beat Clare Minor football team in the final of the series.

Performance by county

 
 All (1928–1999) Leinster Minor Football Results available here .

List of Leinster Finals

The following counties have never won a Leinster minor football title:

References

 
 2
 Leinster